Desert Hawk may refer to:
 Lockheed Martin Desert Hawk, an unmanned aircraft 
 Desert Hawk III, a further development from the above unmanned aircraft
 Sikorsky S-70A Desert Hawk, an export version of the Sikorsky UH-60 Black Hawk helicopter
 Desert Hawk, a locomotive built by Vossloh

In entertainment:
 A character in the RoboCop comics
 A character in the Indiana Jones Summer of Hidden Mysteries
 A creature on Arrakis in the Dune universe

See also
The Desert Hawk (disambiguation)